Renegar Glacier is a steep glacier in Antarctica that flows southeast from Mount Dromedary into Koettlitz Glacier. Mapped by United States Geological Survey (USGS) from ground surveys and U.S. Navy air photos, 1956–62. Named by Advisory Committee on Antarctic Names (US-ACAN) for Lieutenant Garland Renegar, U.S. Navy, R4D aircraft pilot at McMurdo Station, 1960.

See also
Backdrop Ridge

References

Glaciers of Victoria Land
Scott Coast